Ma Wen (born July 1948) is a Chinese politician, currently serving as the Chair of the National People's Congress Internal and Judicial Affairs Committee. Previously served as Minister of Supervision between 2007 and 2013. She also headed the National Bureau of Corruption Prevention.

Biography
Ma was born in Wuqiao County in Hebei province.  She graduated from the history department of Nankai University, specializing in Chinese history. In August 1972, she joined the Communist Party of China (CPC).  

In her youth, Ma Wen worked in Bayannur League in Inner Mongolia.  In 1978, after succeeding in China's National College Entrance Examination, she entered Nankai University to study history.  After graduation, she served in a number of capacities at Nankai University, including as deputy secretary.  In 1989, Ma began working for the Chinese government.  After working briefly as the deputy head of the information office of the National Population and Family Planning Commission, she served as the deputy secretary of the Party organization committee of the Commission.  She began her work with the Central Commission for Discipline Inspection in 1997, after being appointed a member of the organization at the 15th National People's Congress.  She was made the deputy secretary of the Commission in 2004, only the third woman to hold the position, after Deng Yingchao and Liu Liying.  On 28 April 2007, the Minister of Supervision, Li Zhilun, died of an illness. Ma Wen was appointed to take his place in August of that year. She was the second female Minister of Supervision, after Qian Ying. In September of the same year, Ma Wen took up her other current position as head of the National Bureau of Corruption Prevention.

She was a member of the 15th and 16th CPC Central Commissions for Discipline Inspection (CCDI), as well as the Deputy Secretary of the 16th and 17th CCDI Commissions. She was a member of the 17th Central Committee of the Communist Party of China.

References

1948 births
Living people
People's Republic of China politicians from Hebei
Chinese Communist Party politicians from Hebei
Politicians from Cangzhou
Female interior ministers
Yaohua High School alumni
Nankai University alumni